Thodallullu is a 1988 Telugu-language comedy film, produced by G.V.G. Raju under the Vijaya Lakshmi Movies banner and directed by Relangi Narasimha Rao. It stars Rajendra Prasad, Chandra Mohan, Gautami  and music composed by Raj–Koti.

Plot
The film begins in a compound, the home of three families, Bhaskar (Rajendra Prasad) a bus conductor, Narasimham (Satyanarayana) a typist, and Dharma Rao (Suthi Velu) an accountant. Narasimham has three daughters, Lakshmi (Srilakshmi), Uma (Rajyalakshmi) and Aruna (Gauthami). Lakshmi married a loaf Mohan (Chandra Mohan) one that bothers them. At present, Narasimham is engaged to find alliance for Uma but he is hog-tied because of dowry. Meanwhile, Aruna is a headstrong woman, aspires to couple up with Mr. Moneybag. Besides, Dharma Rao is honest, but his wife Varalakshmi (P.R. Varalakshmi) accustomed to spendthrift life for her vanity. Eventually, Bhaskar maintains an affinity with his neighbors and falls for Aruna, but she is hostile. During the interval, Narasimham and Uma attempts suicide due to frequent refusals of the matches when Bhaskar saves them. Thereafter, he detects that their opposite resident, LIC Agent Sudhakar (Subhalekha Sudhakar) likes Uma, so he performs their espousal. Aside from, Dharma Rao endures a huge financial crisis, so, he amends, but was caught and terminated. In addition, his elder daughter Rani (Rajitha) dies. During that plight, Bhaskar aids and succeeds in acquiring his job back. Moreover, reforms Mohan too. Realizing Bhaskar's love everyone appeals to Aruna for wedlock which she denies. Parallelly, Aruna is clutched by a shark Ramesh (Vinod). Being cognizant of it, Bhaskar protects her with the help of Mohan and Sudhakar when she understands his righteousness. Finally, the movie ends on a happy note with the marriage of Bhaskar and Aruna.

Cast

Rajendra Prasad as Bhaskar
Gautami as Aruna
Chandra Mohan as Mohan
Satyanarayana as Narasimham
Subhalekha Sudhakar as Sudhakar 
Suthi Velu as Dharma Rao   
Vinod as Ramesh
Vijaya Rangaraju as Mangal Singh
Haranath as Manager
Bhimeswara Rao as Venkatraju
K. K. Sarma as Marriage Broker
Gadiraju Subba Rao as House Owner
Srilakshmi as Lakshmi
Rajyalakshmi as Uma
P. R. Varalakshmi as Varalakshmi
Kuyili in item number
Rajitha as Rani
Nirmalamma as Papayamma

Soundtrack

Music composed by Raj–Koti. Music released on LEO Audio Company.

References

External links

Indian comedy films
Films directed by Relangi Narasimha Rao
Films scored by Raj–Koti
1980s Telugu-language films
1988 comedy films
1988 films